Roly poly or Roly Poly may refer to:

 An isopod crustacean of the family Armadillidiidae, also known as a pill bug
 A pill millipede (unrelated to the pill bug)
Syzygium alliiligneum, a plant from Queensland, Australia
 Roly-poly toy, a toy that rights itself when pushed over
 Jam roly-poly, a traditional British pudding
 Roly Poly, a chain of sandwich shops in the United States
 "Roly Poly" (song), by Bob Wills
 "Roly-Poly" (T-ara song), by T-ara
 Roly-Poly (game), an ancestor of Roulette
 Roly Poly (horse), thoroughbred racehorse
 The Roly Poly Man, a close associate of the Hurdy Gurdy Man in the 1968 song by Donovan
 A Forward Roll, a gymnastic maneuver
 Roly Poly, a translation of the title of Przekładaniec, a 1968 Polish film by Andrzej Wajda
 Roly Poly, a 1969 TV episode of Thirty-Minute Theatre by BBC Television
 Roly Polys, a dancing group of fat ladies promoted by British comedian Les Dawson
Wayne Shaw (footballer), English footballer nicknamed the Roly Poly Goalie

See also
 The Tale of Samuel Whiskers or The Roly-Poly Pudding, a book by Beatrix Potter
 Rolie Polie Olie, a cartoon character created by William Joyce
 Rolly (disambiguation)

Animal common name disambiguation pages